Baiguo railway station (bit ko) is a railway station of Chengdu–Kunming Railway in Yuexi County, Sichuan, China.

See also
Chengdu–Kunming Railway

Railway stations in Sichuan
Railway stations in China opened in 1970